San Carlos River is one of the larger rivers on East Falkland, in the Falkland Islands. It flows westwards, into San Carlos Water, near Port San Carlos. It begins in the Wickham Heights, with tributaries running off Jack's Mountain

References

Rivers of East Falkland